Ian Arthur Wolstenholme (born 12 January 1943) is an English former amateur footballer who played as a goalkeeper in the Football League for York City, and in non-League football for Sheffield, Enfield and Slough Town.

He played for Enfield in the 1967 FA Amateur Cup Final, saving a last-minute penalty in a 0–0 draw. Enfield won the replay. He was capped twice by the England national amateur team in friendly matches against Denmark and Iceland in August 1971. After retiring, he managed the Harlow Town team that reached the fourth round of the FA Cup in 1979–80.

Away from football, he worked as a PE teacher.

References

1943 births
Living people
Footballers from Bradford
English footballers
England amateur international footballers
Association football goalkeepers
York City F.C. players
Sheffield F.C. players
Enfield F.C. players
Slough Town F.C. players
English Football League players
English football managers
Schoolteachers from Yorkshire
Harlow Town F.C. managers